The 1936 Stanley Cup Finals was contested by the Detroit Red Wings and the Toronto Maple Leafs. This was Detroit's second appearance in the Finals and Toronto's sixth. Detroit would win the series 3–1 to win their first Stanley Cup.

Path to the Final
Detroit defeated the defending champion Montreal Maroons in a best-of-five 3–0 to advance to the Finals. The Leafs had to play a total-goals series; 8–6 against Boston Bruins, and win a best-of-three 2–1 against the New York Americans to advance to the Finals.

Game summaries

Stanley Cup engraving
The 1936 Stanley Cup was presented to Red Wings captain Doug Young by NHL President Frank Calder following the Red Wings 3–2 win over the Maple Leafs in game four.

The following Red Wings players and staff had their names engraved on the Stanley Cup

1935–36 Detroit Red Wings

Detroit: "City of Champions"
When the Red Wings won the 1936 Stanley Cup, the City of Detroit was mired in the Great Depression, which had hit Detroit and its industries particularly hard. But with the success of the Red Wings and other Detroit teams and athletes in the 1935/36 sports season, Detroit's luck appeared to be changing, as the city was dubbed the "City of Champions". The Detroit Tigers started the winning streak by winning the 1935 World Series, and the Detroit Lions continued the process by capturing the 1935 NFL Championship Game. When the Red Wings completed their own championship drive, the city had seen three major sporting league championships in less than a year. Detroit's champions also included Detroit's "Brown Bomber", Joe Louis, the heavyweight boxing titlist; native Detroiter Gar Wood, top unlimited powerboat racer and the first man to go 100 miles per hour on water; and Eddie "the Midnight Express" Tolan, a black Detroiter who won gold medals in the 100- and 200-meter races at the 1932 Summer Olympics.

See also
 1935–36 NHL season

Notes

References

Bibliography
 
 Podnieks, Andrew; Hockey Hall of Fame (2004). Lord Stanley's Cup. Bolton, Ont.: Fenn Pub. pp 12, 50. 

Stanley Cup
Stanley Cup Finals
Detroit Red Wings games
Toronto Maple Leafs games
Ice hockey competitions in Detroit
April 1936 sports events
Stanley Cup
1936 in Detroit
1936 in Ontario
1930s in Toronto
Ice hockey competitions in Toronto